NRON also known as ncRNA repressor of the nuclear factor of activated T cells is a non-coding RNA involved in repressing NFAT. The function of this ncRNA was identified by a large-scale screen of 512 non-coding RNAs discovered in earlier EST sequencing projects.

Each of the RNAs that were conserved between human and mouse were knocked down using shRNAs.  The resulting cell-lines were screened for changes in activity of NFAT.

References

External links 
 

Non-coding RNA
Regulatory sequences